The Birbal Sahni Institute of Palaeosciences (formerly, Birbal Sahni Institute of Palaeobotany; BSIP) is an autonomous institute constituted under the Department of Science and Technology, Government of India. The institute is located at Lucknow, Uttar Pradesh, India and is a seat of higher learning in the field of plant fossil research.

Profile 

The Birbal Sahni Institute of Palaeosciences was established in the year 1946, under the name, Institute of Palaeobotany, a progression of the Palaeobotanical society formed by a group of botanists led by the renowned Indian botanist, Professor Birbal Sahni, known as the father of Dendrology, who became its first director. The initial office of the institute was at the Department of Botany, Lucknow University. The then government of the United Provinces gifted a bungalow sitting on 3.50 acres of land to the institute in 1948, which until today remains its campus.

Savitri Sahni took over the reins of the institute on her husband's death in 1949 and the Institute moved into a new purpose-built building in 1953. The institute, by that time, had already started to be known and, in 1951, UNESCO included it in their Technical Assistance Program. On 9 July 1969, the research activities were alienated from the society and Birbal Sahni Institute of Palaeobotany was formed, in honor of the scientist, as an independent autonomous research organization funded by the Government of India.

BSIP works in close coordination with various organizations such as Geological Survey of India, Physical Research Laboratory, Oil and Natural Gas Commission, Oil India Limited, Coal India Limited, Coal Mine Planning and Design Institute, Council of Scientific and Industrial Research Laboratory, Neyveli Lignite Corporation, Mineral Exploration Corporation Limited, Indian Institutes of Technology, Institute Francais de Pondicherry, Botanical Survey of India, Forest Research Institute, Dehradun, Bhabha Atomic Research Center, Laboratories under Department of Science and Technology, Archaeological Survey of India, Wadia Institute of Himalayan Geology, different State and University Departments of Archaeology and Geology Departments of several Universities. The institute has signed specific MOUs with Oil and natural Gas Corporation, Geological Survey of India (Coal Wing), Delta Studies Institute, Vishakhapattanam (for delta/basin modeling in relation to paramecia and hydrocarbon exploration) and National Institute of Oceanography, Goa  (for Quaternary palaeoclimate of marine and coastal areas).

Objectives 

The main objectives of the institute are set as:
 To develop palaeobotany in all its botanical and geological aspects.
 To constantly update data for interaction with allied disciplines.
 To co-ordinate  with other palaeobotanical  and  geological research  centres in the areas of mutual interest,  such  as diversification of early life, exploration of fossil  fuels, vegetational  dynamics, climatic modelling, conservation  of forests.
 To  disseminate palaeobotanical knowledge  in  universities, educational institutions and   other organisations.

Thrust areas 
The institute has identified the thrust areas of activities on:
 Pre-Cambrian Palaeobiology
 Gondwana Mesozoic Palaeofloristics
 Gondwana Palynology
 Cenozoic Palaeofloristics
 Late Mesozoic-Cenozoic Palynology
 Marine Micropaleontology
 Organic Petrology
 Quaternary Paleoclimate
 Dendrochronology
 Paleoethnobotany
 Isotope and Geochemistry
 Arctic-Antarctic Research

Departments

Museum
BSIP nurses a museum, originally housing the fossil collections of Professor Sahni, but now holds later collections made by the scientists over the years. The collection includes holotype specimens, slides and figured specimens.
 Figured specimens : 6679
 Figured slides : 12740
 Slide negatives : 17504

The museum, with its foundation stone, laid by Birbal Sahni, composed of fossils of various geological ages embedded in a marble-cement block, displays the specimens based on their general and geological relevance. The museum also maintains a Geological Time Clock.

Knowledge Resource Centre
The Institute library is an automated one with database services such as GEOREF, Web of Science, JCCC@INSTIRC and access to CSIR-DST consortium. It operates on a fully integrated multi-user LIBSYS 4 software package with addition of Web OPAC. The journals are made available online to the users.

Herbarium
The Herbarium functions with four different sections:
 General collection of dried plants mounted on herbarium sheets
 Xylarium - collection of woods and their thin sections
 Sporothek - collection of pollen and spore slides and polleniferous material
 Carpothek - collection of fruits, seeds

The fossil specimens such as leaves, cuticle, pollen, spores, fruits, seed and wood, numbering 51,472, are preserved according to their variation, local names, uses, distribution and ecology and include contributions from J. F. Duthie, R. R. Stewart, K. N. Kaul, Birbal Sahni, O. A. Hoeg and A. L. Takhtajan.

Computer Centre
BSIP is well equipped with an advanced computer network with LAN, radio link facility from the Software Park of India, Lucknow and National Knowledge Network connection. The web site of the institute is also maintained by the Computer Centre.

The Palaeobotanist
The Palaeobotanist is a widely acknowledged journal in Palaeobotany, published by the institute. BSIP published the first volume in 1952 as an annual publication. However, the frequency has been increased over the time and, since 1962, is released three times a year.

References

External links 
 Reference on the Department of Science and Technology web site
 News report in the Times of India.
 Birbal Sahni Institute of Palaeobotany Contact Details
 Notification for recruitment
 Profile of Birbal Sahni on Paleobotany web site
 List of Publications on Research gate
 Conference leaflet
 on Wikimapia
 List of Publications on National Library of Australia site
 Reference on University Directory

Further reading
 
 

Paleontological institutions and organizations
Paleontological research institutes
Paleontology in India
Research institutes in Lucknow
Higher education in India
University of Lucknow
1946 establishments in India
Research institutes established in 1946